Tamarix africana, the African tamarisk, is a species of tree in the family Tamaricaceae. They have a self-supporting growth form and simple leaves. Individuals can grow to 6.3 m.

Sources

References 

africana
Flora of Malta